Turn of the century refers to the change from one century to the next.

Turn of the Century may also refer to:

 The Turn of the Century, a 2001 Russian drama film directed by Konstantin Lopushansky
 Turn of the Century, a 1999 novel by Kurt Andersen
 Turn of the Century (roller coaster), today's name is Demon
 Act 1 - Turn of the Century in the Carousel of Progress
 Turn of the Century, first track of the 1st international album of the Bee Gees
 "Turn of the Century", a 1967 single by The Cyrkle
 Turn of the Century, a 1977 song by Yes
 "Turn of the Century" (song), a 1989 song by the Nitty Gritty Dirt Band

See also 
 Fin de siècle (disambiguation)